Socias is a Chilean telenovela originally aired on TVN based on the Argentine telenovela of the same name produced by Pol-ka Producciones.

Cast

Main cast 
 María Elena Swett as Inés Ventura
 Paola Volpato as Monserrat Silva
 Elisa Zulueta as Dolores Montt
 Gonzalo Valenzuela as Álvaro Cárdenas
 Mauricio Pesutic as Ricardo Ossandón
 Marcelo Alonso as Federico Ibáñez
Nicolás Oyarzún as Mariano Rivas
 Álvaro Morales as Pablo Ventura
 Carmen Gloria Bresky as Catalina Díaz
 Mayte Rodríguez as Antonia del Solar
 Delfina Guzmán as Mercedes "Meme" Valdés
 Julio Jung Jr. as Octavio Acuña
 Diego Ruiz as Germán Ossandón
 Jacqueline Boudon as Elvira Rojas
 Otilio Castro as Julito Faúndez
 ¿? as Berta Flores
 Sebastián Contreras as Cristóbal Solé
 Antonia Zilleruelo as Valentina Acuña
 Mateo Montero as Mateo Ibáñez
 María Elisa Vial as Sofía Ventura

Supporting cast 
 Willy Semler as Rubén Schuster
 Liliana García as Bernardita Risopatrón
 Javiera Hernández as Verónica Tagle
 Marcela del Valle as Claudia Riesco
 Rodrigo Bastidas as Padre O'Connor
 Elena Muñoz as Paula Vásquez
 Claudio Valenzuela as Javier Rodríguez
 Sebastián Arrigorriaga as Damián
 Marina Salcedo as Laurita
 Gino Costa como Periodista

See also
 Televisión Nacional de Chile

References

External links 
  

2013 telenovelas
2013 Chilean television series debuts
2014 Chilean television series endings
Chilean telenovelas
Spanish-language telenovelas
Televisión Nacional de Chile telenovelas